Several ships have been named Duckenfield for Duckenfield, Jamaica.

 was launched on the Thames. She was primarily a West Indiaman but between 1803 and 1805 she served the Royal Navy as an armed defense ship. She was last listed in 1819.
 was launched at Great Yarmouth. She was wrecked in 1835.
 was launched at London and spent much of her career in Australian waters as a sixty-miler, traveling between Newcastle and Sydney. She was lost in 1889.

Citations

See also

Ship names